L. nepalensis may refer to:

 Lacconectus nepalensis, a diving beetle
 Lebia nepalensis, a colorful foliage ground beetle
 Leibnitzia nepalensis, a flowering plant
 Lesticus nepalensis, a ground beetle
 Lilioceris nepalensis, a leaf beetle
 Linyphia nepalensis, a sheet weaver
 Loepa nepalensis, a large moth